Muhammad Medical College is a medical institution located outside Mirpurkhas City, Pakistan, on the road to Hyderabad. It was inaugurated in 1999 by Former President Pervez Musharraf.

Location and facilities

Muhammad Medical College (MMC) is located just outside Mirpurkhas (6 km from Zero point) on the road to Hyderabad opposite Ratanabad railway station. Public transport operating along Hyderabad road provides access to the college.

All of the departments are located on the college campus. Each department has its own museum, laboratory and tutorial room. Students receive clinical training in the nearby 500-bed Muhammad Medical college Hospital. There are male and female dormitories. A large three-storey female dormitory has recently been opened.

Affiliations

The college is recognised by several national and international organizations, including the Pakistan Medical and Dental Council (PMDC), and the World Health Organization (WHO). It became affiliated with the Liaquat University of Medical and Health Sciences, Jamshoro, in 2015.

Board of trustees

Founding chair: Dr. Syed Ali Muhammad
Chair: Mrs. Razia Muhammad
Managing Trustee: Prof. Dr. Syed Razi Muhammad
Secretary of the Board of Trustees: Syed Taqi Muhammad
Trustee: Dr. Mrs. A. H. Muhammad 
Trustee: Mr. M. Ibrahim Soomro

References

External links
Official Website of MMC

MMC session 2003

Medical colleges in Sindh
University of Sindh